Warren G. Harding (1865–1923) was the president of the United States from 1921 to 1923.

Warren Harding may also refer to:
Warren G. Harding (Texas politician) (1921–2005)
Warren G. Harding High School
Warren Harding High School
Warren Harding (climber) (1924–2002)